Pretty Eight Machine is a tribute album by Inverse Phase, released on June 14, 2012. It features 8-bit covers of the 10 songs from Nine Inch Nails' 1989 debut album Pretty Hate Machine. The album was crowdfunded via Kickstarter. $3,654 was raised by 162 people for the production. The album was recorded on 8-bit systems arranged to the sound bytes of games and consoles, such as Metal Gear 2 and Castlevania 3. The sound configurations include SID/6581 (Commodore 64), POKEY (Atari 8-bit family), straight 2A03 (NES), SN76489 (Master System), LR35902 (Game Boy), and OPLL (MSX-MUSIC or Japanese  Master System). The album artwork is based on Pretty Hate Machine's 2010 album artwork by Rob Sheridan. Trent Reznor and Rob Sheridan responded positively to the album.

Track listing
All songs written by Trent Reznor and performed by Inverse Phase.

References

External links
Pretty Eight Machine on Bandcamp

2012 debut albums
Tribute albums
Nine Inch Nails
Inverse Phase albums
Kickstarter-funded albums
Self-released albums